Monodaeus is a genus of crabs in the family Xanthidae, containing the following species:

 Monodaeus arnaudi Guinot & Macpherson, 1988
 Monodaeus couchii (Couch, 1851)
 Monodaeus cristulatus Guinot & Macpherson, 1988
 Monodaeus guinotae Forest, 1976
 Monodaeus pettersoni Garth, 1985
 Monodaeus rectifrons (Crosnier, 1967)
 Monodaeus rouxi (Capart, 1951)
 Monodaeus tuberculidens (Rathbun, 1911)

References

Xanthoidea